James Thomas McHenry (2 June 1903 – 7 May 1972) was an Australian rules footballer who played with Footscray in both the Victorian Football Association (VFA) and Victorian Football League (VFL).

Family
The son of James Herbert McHenry (1880-1955), and Elsie Mary McHenry (1882-1980), née Reardon, James Thomas McHenry was born at Broomfield, Victoria on 2 June 1903.
Tommy's younger brother, Alan McHenry, married Brownlow Medallist and co-player, Allan Hopkins', sister Gerturde Hopkins in 1933 making them indirect in-laws.

Notes

References

External links 
 		
 
 Tom F. McHenry, at The VFA Project

1903 births
1972 deaths
Australian rules footballers from Victoria (Australia)
Footscray Football Club (VFA) players
Western Bulldogs players